Report is a 1967 short (13 minute), avant-garde film by Bruce Conner. It consists of found footage concerning the assassination of John F. Kennedy.

Summary
A two-part meditation of JFK assassination that also dissects the phenomenon of the news media as a means of processing the event with recordings of said assassination and other imagery created as a method by Bruce Conner to show the effect JFK's death was to the public and the media.

Legacy
It is listed in the book 1001 Movies You Must See Before You Die.

See also
List of American films of 1967
 JFK (film)

References

External links
 
 Report on MUBI
 Some Remarks on Bruce Conner and Report-Bright Lights Film Journal

1960s avant-garde and experimental films
1967 films
Films directed by Bruce Conner
Collage film
1960s English-language films
1960s American films